Zsuzsa Vanyek (born 18 January 1960) is a Hungarian female former track and field athlete who competed in the long jump, triple jump and the heptathlon. She won 25 national titles indoors and outdoors, including 18 in the long jump and five in heptathlon.

She competed at four editions of the European Athletics Indoor Championships, which her best placing being sixth in 1983.

International competitions

National titles
Hungarian Athletics Championships
Long jump: 1980, 1982, 1983, 1985, 1987, 1988, 1989, 1990, 1991, 1992
Heptathlon: 1981, 1982, 1984, 1985, 1987
Hungarian Indoor Championships
Long jump: 1981, 1982, 1983, 1985, 1986, 1987, 1990, 1992
Triple jump: 1992
Pentathlon: 1982

References

External links

Living people
1960 births
Hungarian female long jumpers
Hungarian female triple jumpers
Hungarian heptathletes
World Athletics Championships athletes for Hungary